Silvana Marjorie Ibarra Castillo (born 1959) is an Ecuadorian singer, actress, and politician.

Biography
Silvana Ibarra was born in Bucay in 1959. She began singing as a child, making her first radio appearance at age 5, and recording her first single at 15.

She has appeared in several television series, beginning with the telenovela  in 1991.

Her 2014 album, Silvana entre cuerdas was produced by her husband, musician Gustavo Pacheco, and contains covers of 12 boleros. Her 2019 album Silvana de bohemia pays tribute to musicians of the 1960s and 70s, such as Julio Jaramillo and Olimpo Cárdenas.

Ibarra and Pacheco were married in 1990. They had one daughter together, sculptor Ámar Pacheco, who won the Queen of Guayaquil talent competition in 2015. President Abdalá Bucaram and Lorena Gallo (formerly Bobbitt, whom Ibarra would portray in an episode of the TV series De la Vida Real) acted as Ámar's godparents at her baptism in October 1996. Ibarra also has two children from a previous relationship. She and Gustavo Pacheco divorced in 2019.

Politics
In the 2002 legislative elections, Ibarra won a seat in the National Congress representing Guayas Province for the Ecuadorian Roldosist Party. During her term she presented eight reform bills.

Discography
 Silvana ...en cuerpo y alma (1989)
 Silvana andicumbias (1990)
 Silvana entre cuerdas (2014)
 Silvana de bohemia (2019)

Television series
  (1991)
 De la Vida Real (2000; one episode, in the role of Lorena Bobbitt)
 Cholicienta (2007)
 : chapter "" (2009)

References

External links
 

1959 births
20th-century Ecuadorian actresses
21st-century Ecuadorian actresses
20th-century Ecuadorian women singers
Ecuadorian Roldosist Party politicians
Ecuadorian telenovela actresses
Living people
Members of the National Congress (Ecuador)
People from Guayas Province
21st-century Ecuadorian women singers